Ladies to Board is a 1924 American silent comedy film directed by John G. Blystone and written by Donald W. Lee. The film stars Tom Mix, Gertrude Olmstead, Philo McCullough, Gilbert Holmes, Gertrude Claire, and Dolores Rousse. The film was released on February 3, 1924, by Fox Film Corporation.

Plot
As described in a review in a film magazine, a crabbed, elderly lady on a motor trip through the west loses control of her car on a steep hill and Tom Faxon (Mix), a native, heroically rescues her. A few years after she dies, leaving her estate, consisting of a sanitarium for old ladies, to Tom. He immediately goes east, taking his chum Bunk (Holmes) with him. Tom gets to be very popular with the old ladies and is especially attracted to a charming nurse, Edith (Olmstead), and to Mrs. Carmichael (Claire), whose son, a successful artist, has neglected her. Tom makes it his business to go and bring the son to the home; he has to use rough methods, but he succeeds. Tom also by using cave-man stuff elopes with the pretty nurse, while Buck elopes with the housekeeper.

Cast             
Tom Mix as Tom Faxton
Gertrude Olmstead as Edith Oliver
Philo McCullough as Evan Carmichael
Gilbert Holmes as Bunk McGinnis
Gertrude Claire as Mrs. Carmichael
Dolores Rousse as Model

Preservation
With no prints of Ladies to Board located in any film archives, it is a lost film.

References

External links

1924 films
1920s English-language films
Silent American comedy films
1924 comedy films
Fox Film films
Films directed by John G. Blystone
American silent feature films
American black-and-white films
1920s American films